Megatibicen tremulus, known generally as the western bush cicada or Cole's bush cicada, is a species of cicada in the family Cicadidae. It is found in the Great Plains of the United States, often associated with Sagebrush.

References

Further reading

External links

 

Insects described in 2008
Cryptotympanini